The Ismaili Center Houston will be the newest of seven such centres worldwide. It was the first to be built in the USA and the third Ismaili Centre in North America, after the Ismaili Centres in Vancouver and Toronto.

Establishment 
Aga Khan Foundation USA has owned the 11-acre site since 2006. The establishment of an Ismaili Center was announced by His Highness the Aga Khan during his Golden Jubilee visit to the USA in 2008.

A design preview was held on November 15, 2021, where architect Farshid Moussavi discussed the project with KTRK-TV’s Melanie Lawson.

In July 2022, McCarthy Building Companies, Inc. announced that it had begun construction. As of this date, no formal ground-breaking had taken place but construction is expected to be finished by the end of 2024.

Architecture and design 
Designed by London-based Farshid Moussavi Architecture, the Center will be a contemporary interpretation of traditional Persian ornamentation,[2] including ceramic mosaics, and screens drawn from various Islamic traditions. The center’s façade will be a combination of different types of stone and steel encased in concrete. The building will feature a series of “eivans,” the Persian word for verandas, which will provide shaded venues for social gatherings at the center. The eivans will supported by 49 columns reminiscent of those used in Persepolis and 17th century palaces in Isfahan, Persia. 

The 10 acres around the center will be transformed into lush gardens by Thomas Woltz of Nelson Byrd Woltz Landscape Architects. The gardens will include tree canopies, fountains, shaded footpaths, flowerbeds, lawns and walkways.

See also
 Islam in Houston

References 

Ismaili centres
Buildings and structures in Houston